Junyuan Secondary School (JYSS) is a co-educational government secondary school in Tampines, Singapore.

History
Junyuan Secondary School was established in January 1999. Cecilia Lee, the first principal, charted the directions for the school with a strong focus on school values. From the beginning, Junyuan started with just 320 students and 17 staff, the school population grew to more than 1,000 within a few years.

Policies
The school has employed the National Education (NE) first policy in 2015 under the leadership of NE Ambassadors led by the NE Department. The patriotic nature of the school is stated in the regulations of the school.

References

External links

Secondary schools in Singapore
Educational institutions established in 1999
Tampines
1999 establishments in Singapore